The 1983 Overseas Final was the third running of the Overseas Final as part of the qualification for the 1983 Speedway World Championship Final to be held in West Germany. The 1983 Final was run at the Belle Vue Stadium in Manchester, England, and was the second last qualifying round for Commonwealth and American riders.

The Top 10 riders qualified for the Intercontinental Final to be held at the White City Stadium in London. Manchester's own Phil Collins won the Overseas Final.

1983 Overseas Final
 Manchester, Belle Vue Stadium
Qualification: Top 10 plus 1 reserve to the Intercontinental Final in London

References

See also
 Motorcycle Speedway

1983
World Individual
International sports competitions in Manchester